Metalurgs Liepāja may refer to:

FK Liepājas Metalurgs, a professional Latvian football club
HK Liepājas Metalurgs, a professional Latvian ice hockey club